The Arizona Bowl is a postseason college football bowl game certified by the NCAA that began play in the 2015 season. The game is held at Arizona Stadium in Tucson, and starting in 2020 has tie-ins with the Mountain West Conference and Mid-American Conference (MAC). The 2021 game was cancelled due to a COVID-19 outbreak within the Boise State team.

History

Alongside the Austin Bowl and Cure Bowl, the Arizona Bowl was one of three new bowl games sanctioned by the NCAA to begin play in the 2015 season (although the Austin Bowl was delayed to 2016, before ultimately being delayed indefinitely due to a moratorium placed on new bowl games by the NCAA). In May 2015, it was reported that the game was to be held at Arizona Stadium, and feature participants from Conference USA and the Mountain West Conference. It marked a return of post-season college football to Tucson, Arizona, which previously hosted the Copper Bowl (the event now known as the Cactus Bowl).

The Arizona Bowl was officially announced on October 1, 2015 as the Nova Home Loans Arizona Bowl. Founded by the Arizona Sports and Entertainment Commission (ASEC), Alan Young, Kemp Ellis, Nikki Balich, the Mountain West Conference and Campus Insiders in a joint venture, the inaugural game was scheduled to be held on December 29, 2015. It was also announced that the Sun Belt Conference would provide a secondary tie-in in case either conference did not have a bowl-eligible team to play the Arizona Bowl.

The inaugural game featured the Nevada Wolf Pack against the Colorado State Rams. As neither Conference USA or the Sun Belt had enough bowl-eligible teams that could be sent to the Arizona Bowl, the game was played between two Mountain West teams, marking the first time since the 1979 Orange Bowl that a non-championship bowl game was played between teams from the same conference. However, the two teams had not played each other during the regular season, as they competed in different divisions.

In May 2016, it was announced that the Sun Belt had reached a four-year deal to serve as a primary tie-in for the Arizona Bowl through 2019, replacing Conference USA. It was the fifth bowl game in which the Sun Belt held a primary tie-in. On July 26, 2019, the bowl announced tie-ins with the Mountain West and Mid-American Conference (MAC) beginning in the 2020 football season and running through the 2025 season.

On October 30, 2020, it was announced that the 2020 game would be played behind closed doors with no spectators admitted due to the COVID-19 pandemic in Arizona.

The 2021 game was canceled after the Boise State Broncos withdrew due to COVID-19 issues within the program. Their scheduled opponent,  the Central Michigan Chippewas, were named as a replacement team for the Sun Bowl.

Sponsorship
The first five editions of the bowl were sponsored by NOVA Home Loans and were officially known as the NOVA Home Loans Arizona Bowl. The company declined to renew its sponsorship in 2020.  On December 23, 2020, it was announced that real estate agency Offerpad had signed on as the title sponsor of the game, making it the Offerpad Arizona Bowl.

On July 27, 2021, Barstool Sports was announced as the title sponsor of the game beginning in 2021. On August 10, the Pima County Board of Supervisors voted to pull its nearly $40,000 in funding for the game, citing objections to "inflammatory statements" that had been made in the past by its founder David Portnoy.

Game results
Rankings are taken from the AP Poll prior to the game being played.

Source:

MVPs

Most appearances
Updated through the December 2022 edition (7 games, 14 total appearances).
Teams with multiple appearances

Teams with a single appearance
Won (4): Air Force, Ball State, New Mexico State, Ohio

Lost (6): Arkansas State, Colorado State, Georgia State, San Jose State, South Alabama, Utah State

Appearances by conference
Updated through the December 2022 edition (7 games, 14 total appearances).

 The 2015 game was contested between two Mountain West teams.

Game records

Media coverage 
Organizers stated that the Arizona Bowl would have a "digitally-focused" broadcasting strategy, first announcing that the website Campus Insiders (a joint venture of IMG College and Silver Chalice) would hold online streaming rights to the game as its "primary digital media partner". Campus Insiders, in turn, partnered with 120 Sports (a digital sports network that is a joint venture of Silver Chalice, MLB Advanced Media, and Time Inc.) to provide interactive in-game content, as well as pre-game, halftime, and post-game shows for the webcast.

Pressure built for the bowl to be traditionally televised, however, and soon, the bowl organizers capitulated and found a television partner. Rights to the 2015 and 2016 games were held by Sinclair Broadcast Group's American Sports Network; the telecasts were syndicated to local broadcast television stations and regional sports networks.

On April 18, 2017, it was announced that CBS Sports Network had acquired rights to the Arizona Bowl under a "multi-year" deal; Campus Insiders (which merged with ASN to form the new Stadium network) is no longer involved in the broadcast.

For its 2020 edition, the game was promoted to the main CBS network, as the Sun Bowl (which is typically aired by the network) was cancelled due to COVID-19-related complications.

The 2021 game was to have been streamed by Barstool, with the company citing that its sponsorship "would have an implication on where the Arizona Bowl could be broadcast".

Television

Notes

References

External links
 

 
College football bowls
Sports in Tucson, Arizona
Sports competitions in Arizona
2015 establishments in Arizona
Recurring sporting events established in 2015
Events in Tucson, Arizona